Amanda Sin is a Canadian cross-country mountain biker from Collingwood, Ontario. She is a member of the Canadian National team. She had great success for Canada at the 2011 Pan American Games when the 34-year-old won Canada's first medal at those games.

References

Living people
Canadian female cyclists
Cross-country mountain bikers
Cyclists from Ontario
Cyclists at the 2011 Pan American Games
Sportspeople from Collingwood, Ontario
Canadian mountain bikers
Year of birth missing (living people)
Pan American Games bronze medalists for Canada
Pan American Games medalists in cycling
Medalists at the 2011 Pan American Games